Panther's Claw may refer to:

The Panther's Claw, a 1942 American film directed by William Beaudine
Operation Panther's Claw, an ongoing United Kingdom-led military operation of the War in Afghanistan in Helmand Province in southern Afghanistan